Captain Mukhtiar Singh (25 October 1943 – 19 November 2019), popularly known as Mukhiya, was an Indian wrestler. He was the first one to grab two gold medals for India in Commonwealth Games and also he won a bronze medal in the 1970 Asian Games. He served Indian Army for 26 years and retired as Hon. Captain in 1988. Indian Army honored him with Vishisht Seva Medal (VSM) for his outstanding services. He was awarded Arjun Award, the second-highest sporting honour of India, in 1967.

Biography

Mukhtiar Singh was born on 25 October 1943 in village Baltikari, Raya, Mathura, Uttar Pradesh. He was popularly known as Mukhiya Pahalwan. His father Ninua Singh was a farmer while his mother Parmali Devi was a housewife. Singh grew up with five brothers. At the age of 12 he had a good hold on his sport and was known by people of nearby districts. After gaining some potential he started practicing under the guidance of his uncle Amichand Pahalwan. He was enrolled in 2nd Jat Regiment, Indian Army in 1963. Later he participated in Services wrestling in the lightweight class and became the champion of Eastern Command on his very first appearance. But he was firstly recognized in the Indian Army when he fought against international wrestler of Indian Army Pahalwan Uday Chand during services tournament. He was awarded with gold medal in the lightweight in the Services championship in 1965. He stood first in 1966 in his weight class. He was accordingly selected to represent India in the British Empire and Commonwealth Games at Kingston, Jamaica in 1966. He won a gold medal defeating all wrestlers in his class there, including the famous Pakistani wrestler M. Hussain and Greig of New Zealand. He was obstructed by a knee injury from taking part in the Vth Asian games at Bangkok in 1966.

Singh was promoted to naib subedar on 15 October 1974, and to subedar on 1 June 1980. Promoted to subedar-major on 1 April 1986, he received a promotion to honorary captain in the 1988 Independence Day promotions list.

Achievements and participation

Olympic games
1968: Mexico Olympic
1972: Munich Olympic
World Wrestling Championship
1967: Delhi [India]
1970: Edmonton [Canada]
Asian Games
1970: Bangkok, Thailand [Bronze Medal]
1974: Theran, Iran
Commonwealth games
1966: Kingston, Jamaica [Gold Medal]
1970: Edinburgh, Scotland [Gold Medal]
Hind Kesari
1964: Karnal, Haryana
Other international tournaments
1964: Indo-Iran Wrestling Championship, Tehran [Gold Medal]
1964: Indo-Newzealand Wrestling Championship, Newzealand [Gold Medal]
1965: Indo-Iran Wrestling Championship, New Delhi [Gold Medal]
1965: Indo-American Wrestling Championship, Mexico [Gold Medal]
1966: Indo-England Wrestling Championship, England [Gold Medal]
1967: Jasan Meet Wrestling Championship, Kabul Afghanistan [Gold Medal]
1972: Indo-Soviet Wrestling Championship, Moscow Russia [Gold Medal]
1972: Indo-Russian Wrestling Meet, New Delhi [Gold Medal]
1976: Indo-Soviet Wrestling Meet, New Delhi [Gold Medal]
1976: Indo-Pak Wrestling Meet, New Delhi [Gold Medal]

Awards

1967― Arjun Award
1992― Mewar Award
1986― Vishisht Seva Medal (VSM)
2018― Hon. Sportsperson Award (By C.M Yogi Adityanath)
1996― N.I.S (National Inst. Of Sports, Patiala Punjab)

Judge, coach and referee

1991: World Wrestling Championship, Varna, Bulgaria
1996: Asian Wrestling Championship, New Delhi
1997: World Cadet Wrestling Championship, New Delhi
1998: Takhati Cup Wrestling Championship, Iran

Death
Mukhtiar Singh was struck with Alzheimer's disease and he passed away on 19 November 2019.

References

External links
 

1943 births
2019 deaths
Indian male sport wrestlers
Olympic wrestlers of India
Wrestlers at the 1968 Summer Olympics
Wrestlers at the 1972 Summer Olympics
Place of birth missing
Asian Games medalists in wrestling
Wrestlers at the 1970 Asian Games
Wrestlers at the 1974 Asian Games
Asian Games bronze medalists for India
Medalists at the 1970 Asian Games
Commonwealth Games medallists in wrestling
Commonwealth Games gold medallists for India
Wrestlers at the 1966 British Empire and Commonwealth Games
Wrestlers at the 1970 British Commonwealth Games
Recipients of the Arjuna Award
Medallists at the 1966 British Empire and Commonwealth Games
Medallists at the 1970 British Commonwealth Games